The Bell OH-58 Kiowa is a family of single-engine single-rotor military helicopters used for observation, utility, and direct fire support. It was produced by the American manufacturer Bell Helicopter and is closely related to the Model 206A JetRanger civilian helicopter.

The OH-58 was originally developed during the early 1960s as the D-250 for the Light Observation Helicopter (LOH). While the rival Hughes OH-6 Cayuse was picked over Bell's submission in May 1965, the company refined its design to create the Model 206A, a variant of which it successfully submitted to the reopened LOH competition two years later. The initial model, designated by the service as the OH-58A, was introduced in May 1969. Successive models would follow, often with uprated engines, enhanced protection systems, and other improvements, culminating in the OH-58F. Additional improvements, such as the OH-58X, were proposed but ultimately not pursued.

During the 1970s, the US Army became interested in pursuing an advanced scout helicopter, for which the OH-58 would be further developed, evaluated, and ultimately procured as the OH-58D Kiowa Warrior. The OH-58D is equipped to perform armed reconnaissance missions and to provide fire support to friendly ground forces; it is equipped with a distinctive Mast Mounted Sight (MMS) containing various sensors for target acquisition and laser designation. Another visible feature present on most OH-58s are knife-like extensions above and below the cockpit that form part of the passive wire strike protection system. The early-build OH-58s were equipped with a two-bladed main rotor, while the OH-58D and newer variants have a four-bladed rotor.

The OH-58 was primarily produced for the United States Army. Only two months after the type's entry to service, it was first deployed into the Vietnam War. The US Army would make extensive use of various OH-58 models across numerous war zones over the decades, seeing active combat during the Gulf War, the Invasion of Panama, and the War in Afghanistan among others. During 2017, the US Army opted to withdraw its remaining OH-58s and replace them with newer rotorcraft, such as the Boeing AH-64 Apache and Eurocopter UH-72 Lakota, as well as increasing use of unmanned aerial vehicles (UAVs). Furthermore, the OH-58 has been exported to Austria, Canada, Croatia, the Dominican Republic, Taiwan, Saudi Arabia, and Greece. It has also been produced under license in Australia.

Development

Light Observation Helicopter (LOH)
On 14 October 1960, the United States Navy approached 25 helicopter manufacturers to request on behalf of the Army the submission of proposals for a Light Observation Helicopter (LOH). Bell Helicopter was one of the manufacturers approached, and chose to enter the competition along with 12 other manufacturers, including Hiller Aircraft and Hughes Tool Co., Aircraft Division. Bell's design was internally referred to as the D-250, and would be officially designated as the YHO-4. On 19 May 1961, Bell and Hiller were announced as winners of the design competition.

Bell developed the D-250 design into the Model 206, while the HO-4 designation was changed to YOH-4A in 1962, and produced five prototype aircraft for the Army's test and evaluation phase. On 8 December 1962, the first prototype performed its maiden flight. The YOH-4A was also called the Ugly Duckling in comparison to other contending aircraft. After a fly off of the Bell, Hughes and Fairchild-Hiller prototypes, the Hughes OH-6 Cayuse was selected in May 1965.

When the YOH-4A was rejected by the Army, Bell went about solving the problem of marketing the aircraft. In addition to the image problem, the helicopter lacked cargo space and only provided cramped quarters for the planned three passengers in the back. The solution was a fuselage redesigned to be more sleek and aesthetic, adding  of cargo space in the process. The redesigned aircraft was designated as the Model 206A, and Bell President Edwin J. Ducayet named it the JetRanger denoting an evolution from the popular Model 47J Ranger.

In 1967, the Army reopened the LOH competition for bids because Hughes Tool Co. Aircraft Division could not meet the contractual production demands. Bell resubmitted for the program using the Bell 206A. Fairchild-Hiller failed to resubmit their bid with the YOH-5A, which they had successfully marketed as the FH-1100. In the end, Bell underbid Hughes to win the contract and the Bell 206A was designated as the OH-58A. Following the U.S. Army's naming convention for helicopters, the OH-58A was named Kiowa in honor of the Native American tribe.

Advanced Scout Helicopter
In the 1970s, the U.S. Army began evaluating the need to improve the capabilities of their scout aircraft. Anticipating the AH-64A's replacement of the venerable AH-1, the Army began shopping the idea of an Aerial Scout Program to stimulate the development of advanced technological capabilities for night vision and precision navigation equipment. The stated goals of the program included prototypes that would: ...possess an extended target acquisition range capability by means of a long-range stabilized optical subsystem for the observer, improved position location through use of a computerized navigation system, improved survivability by reducing aural, visual, radar, and infrared signatures, and an improved flight performance capability derived from a larger engine to provide compatibility with attack helicopters.

During March 1974, the Army created a special task force at Fort Knox to develop the system requirements; by the following year, the task force had devised the requirements for an Advanced Scout Helicopter (ASH) program. The requirements were formulated around an rotorcraft capable of performing in day, night, and adverse weather, and compatible with all advanced weapons systems planned for development and fielding into the 1980s. The program was approved by the System Acquisition Review Council and the Army prepared for competitive development to begin the next year. However, as the Army tried to get the program off the ground, Congress declined to provide funding in the fiscal year 1977 budget and the ASH Project Manager's Office (PM-ASH) was closed on 30 September 1976.

While no development occurred for some years, the program survived as a requirement without funding. On 30 November 1979, the decision was made to defer development of an advanced scout helicopter in favor of modifying existing airframes in inventory as a near term scout helicopter (NTSH) option. The development of a mast-mounted sight would be the primary focus to improve the ability to perform reconnaissance, surveillance, and target acquisition missions while remaining hidden behind trees and terrain. Both the UH-1 and the OH-58 were evaluated as NTSH candidates, but the UH-1 was dropped from consideration due to its larger size and ease of detection. The OH-58, on the other hand demonstrated a dramatic reduction in detectability with a Mast-Mounted Sight (MMS).

On 10 July 1980, the Army decided that the NTSH would be a competitive modification program based on developments in the commercial helicopter sector, particularly Hughes Helicopters' Hughes 500D, which had made major improvements over the OH-6.

Army Helicopter Improvement Program (AHIP)
The Army's decision to acquire the NTSH resulted in the "Army Helicopter Improvement Program (AHIP)". Both Bell Helicopter and Hughes Helicopters redesigned their scout aircraft to compete for the contract. Bell offered a more robust version of the OH-58 in their Model 406, and Hughes offered an upgraded version of the OH-6. On 21 September 1981, Bell Helicopter Textron was awarded a development contract. On 6 October 1983, the first prototype performed its maiden flight, and the aircraft entered service two years later as the OH-58D.

Initially intended for attack, cavalry, and artillery roles, the Army only approved a low initial production level and confined the OH-58D's role to field artillery observation. The Army also directed that a follow-on test be conducted to further evaluate it due to perceived deficiencies. On 1 April 1986, the Army formed a task force at Fort Rucker, Alabama, to remedy deficiencies in the AHIP. During 1988, the Army had planned to discontinue the OH-58D and focus on the LHX; however, Congress approved $138 million to expand the program, calling for the AHIP to operate with the Apache as a hunter/killer team; the AHIP would locate targets and the Apache would destroy them in a throwback to the traditional OH-58/AH-1 relationship.

The Secretary of the Army directed instead that the aircraft's armament systems be upgraded, based on experience with Task Force 118's performance operating armed OH-58Ds in the Persian Gulf in support of Operation Prime Chance, and that the type be used primarily for scouting and armed reconnaissance. The armed aircraft would be known as the OH-58D Kiowa Warrior, denoting its new armed configuration. Beginning with the 202nd aircraft (s/n 89-0112) in May 1991, all remaining OH-58Ds were produced in the Kiowa Warrior configuration. During January 1992, Bell received its first retrofit contract to convert all remaining OH-58Ds to the Kiowa Warrior configuration.

Design 

The Bell OH-58 Kiowa is a family of single-engine single-rotor military helicopters principally used for observation, utility, and direct fire support. The primary role of the original OH-58A was to identify targets for other platforms, such as the Bell AH-1 Cobra attack helicopter and ground artillery; it lacked any armaments and weighed 1,451kg (3,200lb) when fully loaded, being able to carry a small amount of cargo or up to two passengers. While initial examples were reliant on the crew to conduct observations, later models were furnished with sophisticated sensors to precisely determine a target's location. Payload capacity was also increased considerably on later-build rotorcraft, the OH-58D Kiowa was designed to carry a maximum load of 2,495kg, 72% more capacity than the original version.

Early Kiowas were fitted with a flexible twin-bladed main rotor; starting with the OH-58D, a four-bladed rigid main rotor was used. This was entirely composed of composite materials, the OH-58D was the first US Army rotorcraft to incorporate an all-composite main rotor hub. Later models were outfitted as light gunships, being equipped with various armaments, such as Stinger air-to-air missiles, a .50-caliber machine gun, podded 70mm Hydra rockets and AGM-114 Hellfire air to ground missiles. Other areas of improvement were the avionics and the cockpit; new navigation and communication systems were installed along with new and larger flight instrumentation, while all light sources were redesigned for compatibility with Night Vision Goggles (NVG). Later versions were outfitted with a glass cockpit, which retained conventional instrumentation as a fallback measure.

The OH-58D introduced perhaps the most distinctive feature of the Kiowa family — the Mast Mounted Sight (MMS), which resembles a beach ball perched above the rotor system. The MMS by Ball Aerospace & Technologies has a gyro-stabilized platform containing a television system (TVS), a thermal imaging system (TIS), and a laser range finder/designator (LRF/D). These features gave the OH-58D the additional mission capability of target acquisition and laser designation in day or night, limited-visibility and adverse weather. In combination with the 1553 databus, the OH-58D being first US Army helicopter to be fielded with such equipment, target data from the sensors could be directly passed to precision-guided weapons.

The MMS was developed by the McDonnell Douglas Corp. in Huntington Beach, CA. Production took place primarily at facilities in Monrovia, CA. As a result of a merger with Boeing, and a later sale of the business unit, the program is currently owned and managed by DRS Technologies, with engineering support based in Cypress, CA, and production support taking place in Melbourne, FL. On the OH-58F, the MMS was removed, its functions having been replaced by the AAS-53 Common Sensor Payload, which is mounted on the chin.

One distinctive feature of operational OH-58s are the knife-like extensions above and below the cockpit which are part of the passive wire strike protection system; it protects 90% of the frontal area of the helicopter from wire strikes that can be encountered at low altitudes by directing wires to the upper or lower blades before they can entangle the rotor blade or landing skids. The OH-58 was the first helicopter to test this system, after which the system was adopted by the US Army for the OH-58 and most of their other helicopters. Various other defensive and survivability measures were incorporated, such as ballistic floor armor, a missile warning system, crashworthy seats, and infrared suppression systems for the engine exhaust.

Operational history
During May 1969, the first OH-58A Kiowa was officially received at a ceremony held at Bell Helicopter's Fort Worth plant, officiated by Major General John Norton, commanding general of the Army Aviation Materiel Command (AMCOM). Two months later, on 17 August 1969, production OH-58A helicopters arrived in South Vietnam for the first time; their deployment was accompanied by a New Equipment Training Team (NETT) comprising personnel from both the US Army and Bell Helicopters. Although the Kiowa production contract had replaced the LOH contract with Hughes, the OH-58A did not automatically replace the OH-6A in operations; subsequently, the Kiowa and the Cayuse would continue operating in the same theater until the end of the conflict.

Vietnam War

On 27 March 1970, an OH-58A Kiowa (s/n 68-16785) was shot down over South Vietnam, one of the first OH-58A losses of the war. The pilot, Warrant Officer Ralph Quick, Jr., was flying Lieutenant Colonel Joseph Benoski, Jr. as an artillery spotter. After completing a battle damage assessment for a previous fire mission, the aircraft was damaged by .51 inch (13 mm) machine gun fire and crashed, killing both crew members. Approximately 45 OH-58A helicopters were destroyed during the Vietnam War due to combat losses and accidents. One of the last combat losses in the theatre was of an OH-58A (s/n 68-16888) from A Troop, 3-17th Cavalry, flown by First Lieutenant Thomas Knuckey. On 27 May 1971, Lieutenant Knuckey was also flying a battle damage assessment mission when his aircraft came under machine gun fire and exploded. Knuckey and his observer, Sergeant Philip Taylor, both died in the explosion.

Operation Prime Chance
During early 1988, it was decided that armed OH-58D (AHIP) helicopters from the 118th Aviation Task Force would be phased in to replace the SEABAT (AH-6/MH-6) teams of Task Force 160th to carry out Operation Prime Chance, the escort of oil tankers during the Iran–Iraq War. On 24 February 1988, two AHIP helicopters reported to the Mobile Sea Base Wimbrown VII, and the helicopter team ("SEABAT" team after their callsign) stationed on the barge returned to the United States. For the next few months, the AHIP helicopters on the Wimbrown VII shared patrol duties with the SEABAT team on the Hercules. Coordination proved difficult, despite frequent requests from TF-160, the SEABAT team on the Hercules was not replaced by an AHIP detachment until June 1988. The OH-58D helicopter crews involved in the operation received deck landing and underwater survival training from the Navy.

In November 1988, the number of OH-58D helicopters that supported Task Force 118 was reduced. However, the rotorcraft continued to operate from the Navy's Mobile Sea Base Hercules, the frigate Underwood, and the destroyer Conolly. OH-58D operations primarily entailed reconnaissance flights at night, and depending on maintenance requirements and ship scheduling, Army helicopters usually rotated from the mobile sea base and other combatant ships to a land base every seven to fourteen days. On 18 September 1989, an OH-58D crashed during night gunnery practice and sank, but with no loss of personnel. When the Mobile Sea Base Hercules was deactivated in September 1989, all but five OH-58D helicopters redeployed to the continental United States.

Gulf War

During Operation Desert Storm, 115 deployed OH-58D helicopters participated in a wide variety of critical combat missions and were vital to the success of the ground forces mission. During Operation Desert Shield and Operation Desert Storm, the Kiowas collectively flew nearly 9,000 hours with a 92 percent fully mission capable rate. The Kiowa Warrior had the lowest ratio of maintenance hours to flight hours of any combat helicopter in the war.

RAID
In 1989, Congress mandated that the Army National Guard would take part in the country's War on Drugs, enabling them to aid federal, state and local law enforcement agencies with "special congressional entitlements". In response, the Army National Guard Bureau created the Reconnaissance and Aerial Interdiction Detachments (RAID) in 1992, consisting of aviation units in 31 states with 76 specially modified OH-58A helicopters to assume the reconnaissance/interdiction role in the fight against illegal drugs. During 1994, 24 states conducted more than 1,200 aerial counterdrug reconnaissance and interdiction missions, conducting many of these missions at night. Eventually, the program was expanded to cover 32 states and consisting of 116 aircraft, including dedicated training aircraft at the Western Army Aviation Training Site (WAATS) in Marana, Arizona.

The RAID program's mission has now been expanded to include the war against terrorism and supporting U.S. Border Patrol activities in support of homeland defense. The National Guard RAID units' Area of Operation (AO) is the only one in the Department of Defense that is wholly contained within the borders of the United States.

Operation Just Cause and action in the 1990s
During Operation Just Cause in 1989, a team consisting of an OH-58 and an AH-1 were part of the Aviation Task Force during the securing of Fort Amador in Panama. The pilot was rescued, but the co-pilot died.

On 17 December 1994, Army Chief Warrant Officers (CWO) David Hilemon and Bobby Hall left Camp Page, South Korea on a routine training mission along the Demilitarized Zone (DMZ). Their flight was intended to be to a point known as Checkpoint 84, south of the DMZ "no-fly zone", but the OH-58C Kiowa strayed nearly  into the Kangwon Province, inside North Korean airspace, due to errors in navigating the snow-covered, rugged terrain. The helicopter was shot down by North Korean troops and CWO Hilemon was killed. CWO Hall was held captive and the North Korean government insisted that the crew had been spying. Five days of negotiations resulted in the North Koreans turning over Hilemon's body to U.S. authorities. The negotiations failed to secure Hall's immediate release. After 13 days in captivity, Hall was freed on 30 December, uninjured.

Afghanistan and Iraq 

The U.S. Army employed the OH-58D during Operation Iraqi Freedom in Iraq and Operation Enduring Freedom in Afghanistan. Between a combination of combat and accidents, over 35 airframes have been lost, resulting in the deaths of 35 pilots. Their presence was also anecdotally credited with saving lives, having been used to rescue wounded despite their small size. In Iraq, OH-58Ds reportedly flew 72 hours per month, while in Afghanistan, the type flew 80 hours per month. During April 2013, Bell stated that the OH-58 collectively accumulated 820,000 combat hours, and had achieved a 90% mission capable rate.

Retirement
The U.S. Army's first attempt to replace the OH-58 was the RAH-66 Comanche of the Light Helicopter Experimental program, which was canceled in 2004. Airframe age and losses led to the Armed Reconnaissance Helicopter program and the Bell ARH-70, which was canceled in 2008 due to cost overruns. The third replacement effort was the Armed Aerial Scout program. Due to uncertainty in the AAS program and fiscal restraints, the OH-58F's planned retirement was extended from 2025 to 2036. The Kiowa's scout role was supplemented by tactical unmanned aerial vehicles, the two platforms often acting in conjunction to provide reconnaissance to expose crews to less risk. The OH-58F had the ability to control UAVs directly to safely perform scout missions. In 2011, the Kiowa was scheduled to be replaced by the light version of the Future Vertical Lift aircraft in the 2030s.

In December 2013, the U.S. Army had 338 Kiowas in its active-duty force and 30 in the Army National Guard. The Army considered retiring the Kiowa as part of a wider restructuring to cut costs and reduce the variety of helicopters operated. The Analysis of Alternatives for the AAS program found that operating the Kiowa alongside RQ-7 Shadow UAVs was the most affordable and capable solution, while the AH-64E Apache Guardian was the most capable immediate solution. One proposal was to transfer all Army National Guard and Army Reserve AH-64s to the active Army for use as scouts to divest the OH-58. The Apache costs 50 percent more than the Kiowa to operate and maintain; studies note that had it been used in place of the Kiowa in Iraq and Afghanistan, total operating costs would have risen by $4 billion, but also saved $1 billion per year in operating and sustainment costs. UH-60 Black Hawks would transfer from the active Army to reserve and Guard units. The aim was to retire older helicopters and retain those with the best capabilities to save money. Retiring the Kiowa would fund Apache upgrades.

The Army placed 26 out of 335 OH-58Ds in non-flyable storage during 2014. In anticipation of divestment, the Army looked to see if other military branches, government agencies, and foreign customers had interest in buying the type. The Kiowas were considered to be well priced for foreign countries with limited resources; Bell had not yet agreed to support them if sold overseas. Media expected OH-58s to go to foreign militaries rather than civil operators due to high operating cost. By 2015, the Army had divested 33 OH-58Ds. By January 2016, the Army had divested all but two OH-58D squadrons. In June 2016, members of 1st Squadron, 17th Cavalry Regiment, 82nd Combat Aviation Brigade, arrived in South Korea as part of the Kiowa's last deployment in U.S. Army service. In January 2017, the last Kiowa Warrior performed their last live fire maneuver before retirement.

Ex-U.S. Army OH-58Ds were made available through Excess Defense Article and foreign military sales (FMS) programs. In November 2014, Croatia sent a letter of intent for the acquisition of 16 OH-58Ds. In 2016, Croatia and Tunisia became the first nations to request the helicopters, ordering 16 and 24, respectively. Croatia received the first batch of 5 OH-58Ds at the Zadar-Zemunik air base on 30 June 2016. In early 2018, Greece was granted 70 OH-58Ds via an FMS arrangement, the type has been initially stationed at Hellenic Army Aviation air base at Stefanovikio.

In March 2020, the U.S. Army selected the Bell 360 Invictus and Sikorsky Raider X as part of the Future Attack Reconnaissance Aircraft (FARA) program to fill the capability gap left by the retirement of the OH-58. On 9 July 2020, the US Army retired its last OH-58Cs from active service at Fort Polk.

Variants

OH-58A

The OH-58A Kiowa is a four-place observation helicopter. It has two-place pilot seating, although the controls in the left seat are designed to be removed to carry a passenger up front. During its Vietnam development, it was fitted with the M134 Minigun, a 7.62 mm electrically operated machine gun.

The Australian Army leased eight OH-58As in 1971 in Vietnam for eight months. The Australian Government procured the OH-58A for the Australian Army and Royal Australian Navy as the CAC CA-32. Licensed produced in Australia by Commonwealth Aircraft Corporation, the CA-32 was the equivalent of the 206B-1 (uprated engine and longer rotor blades). The first twelve of 56 were built in the U.S. then partially disassembled and shipped to Australia, where they were reassembled. Helicopters in the naval fleet were retired in 2000.

A total of 74 OH-58As were delivered to the Canadian Armed Forces as COH-58A and later redesignated CH-136 Kiowa. As many as 12 surplus Kiowas were sold to the Dominican Republic Air Force, and others sold privately in Australia. 

In 1978, OH-58As began to be converted to the same engine and dynamic components as the OH-58C. In 1992, 76 OH-58A were modified with another engine upgrade, a thermal imaging system, a communications package for law enforcement, enhanced navigational equipment and high skid gear as part of the Army National Guard's (ARNG) Counter-Drug RAID program. The U.S. Army retired its last OH-58A in November 2017.

OH-58B
The OH-58B was an export version for the Austrian Air Force.

OH-58C

Equipped with a more robust engine, the OH-58C was supposed to solve issues regarding the Kiowa's power. In addition to the improved engine, it had unique IR suppression systems mounted on its exhaust. Early OH-58Cs had flat-panel windscreens as an attempt to reduce glint from the sun, which could reveal its location to enemies. The windscreens had a negative effect of limiting the crew's forward view, a previous strength of the original design.

The aircraft was also equipped with a larger instrument panel, roughly a third bigger than the OH-58A panel, which held larger flight instruments. The panel was also equipped with Night Vision Goggle (NVG) compatible cockpit lighting. The OH-58C were also the first U.S. Army scout helicopter to be equipped with the AN/APR-39 radar detector, which alerted the crew to active anti-aircraft radar systems nearby. Some OH-58Cs were armed with two AIM-92 Stingers and are sometimes referred to as OH-58C/S, the "S" referring to the Stinger addition. Called Air-To-Air Stinger (ATAS), the weapon system was intended to provide an air defense capability.

The OH-58C was the final variant of the Kiowa in active service with the US Army, its final use with the service being as a training aircraft. On 9 July 2020, the US Army retired the last OH-58Cs from service.

OH-58D

The OH-58D (Bell Model 406) was the result of the Army Helicopter Improvement Program (AHIP). An upgraded transmission and engine gave extra power, needed for nap-of-the-earth flight profiles, and a four-bladed main rotor made it quieter than the two-bladed OH-58C. The OH-58D introduced the distinctive Mast-Mounted Sight (MMS) above the main rotor, and a mixed glass cockpit with traditional instruments as "standby" for emergencies.

The Bell 406CS "Combat Scout" was based on the OH-58D (sometimes referred to as the MH-58D). Fifteen aircraft were sold to Saudi Arabia. A roof-mounted Saab HeliTOW sight system was opted for in place of the MMS. The 406CS also had detachable weapon hardpoints on each side.

The AH-58D was an OH-58D version operated by Task Force 118 (4th Squadron, 17th Cavalry) and modified with armament in support of Operation Prime Chance. The weapons and fire control systems would become the basis for the Kiowa Warrior. AH-58D is not an official DOD aircraft designation, but is used by the Army in reference to these aircraft.

The Kiowa Warrior, sometimes referred to by its acronym KW, is the armed version of the OH-58D. A key difference between the Kiowa Warrior and original AHIP aircraft is a universal weapons pylon found mounted on both sides of the fuselage, capable of carrying combinations of AGM-114 Hellfire missiles, air-to-air Stinger (ATAS) missiles, 7-shot  Hydra-70 rocket pods, and an M296 0.50 in (12.7 mm) caliber machine gun. The Kiowa Warrior also includes improvements in available power, navigation, communication, survivability, and deployability.

OH-58F
The OH-58F is an OH-58D upgrade. The Cockpit and Sensor Upgrade Program (CASUP) adds a nose-mounted targeting and surveillance system alongside the MMS. The AAS-53 Common Sensor Payload has an infrared camera, color Electro-Optical camera, and image intensifier; via weight and drag reductions, flight performance increased by 1–2%. Cockpit upgrades include the Control and Display Subsystem version 5, with more storage and processing power, three color multi-function displays, and dual-independent advanced moving maps. It has Level 2 Manned-Unmanned (L2MUM) teaming, the Force Battle Command Brigade and Below (FBCB2) display screen, and can be updated to Blue Force Tracker 2. Survivability enhancements include ballistic floor armor and the Common Missile Warning System. It has greater situational awareness, digital inter-cockpit communications, HELLFIRE future upgrades, redesigned wiring harness, Health and Usage Monitoring (HUMS), and enhanced weapons functionality via 1760 digital interface. Rolls-Royce proposed engine tweaks to raise output by 12%.

In October 2012, the first OH-58F was finished. Unlike most military projects, the Army designed and built the new variant itself, which lowered development costs. The weight savings are attributed to more efficient wiring and a lighter sensor. The first production aircraft started being built in January 2013 and was handed over to the Army by year end. Low rate production was to start in March 2015, with the first operational squadron being fully equipped by 2016. The Army was to buy 368 OH-58Fs, with older OH-58 variants to be remanufactured. Due to battle damage and combat attrition, total OH-58F numbers would be about 321 aircraft. The OH-58F's first flight occurred on 26 April 2013.

The Army chose to retire the Kiowa and end the CASUP upgrades. CASUP and SLEP upgrades was costed at $3 billion and $7 billion respectively. The OH-58D could do 20 percent of armed aerial scout mission requirements, the OH-58F upgrade raised that to 50 percent. Replacing the Kiowa with Apaches and UAVs in scout roles met 80 percent of requirements. In early 2014, Bell received a stop-work order for the Kiowa CASUP program.

OH-58F Block II

On 14 April 2011, Bell performed the successful first flight of the OH-58F Block II variant. It was Bell's entry in the Armed Aerial Scout (AAS) program. It built on the improvements of the F-model, adding features such as the Honeywell HTS900 turboshaft engine, the transmission and main rotors of the Bell 407, and the tail and tail rotor of the Bell 427. Bell started flight demonstrations in October 2012. Bell hoped for the Army to go with their service life extension models instead of the AAS program. The OH-58F is an "obsolescence upgrade", while the Block II was seen as the performance upgrade. This gave the Army financial flexibility via the option of upgrading the Kiowa to the OH-58F and later continuing to the Block II when there were sufficient funds. In late 2012, the Army recommended that the AAS program proceed. The Army ended the AAS program in late 2013. In light of sequestration budget cuts in 2013, it was decided that the $16 billion cost to buy new armed scout helicopters was too great.

Others
The OH-58X was a modification of the fourth development OH-58D (s/n 69-16322) with partial stealth features and a chin-mounted McDonnell-Douglas Electronics Systems turret as a night piloting system; including a Kodak FLIR system with a 30-degree field of view. Avionics systems were consolidated and moved to the nose, making room for a passenger seat in the rear. No aircraft were produced.

Operators

Current operators

Austrian Air Force

 Croatian Air Force

 Dominican Air Force

 Hellenic Army

 Iraqi Army

 Royal Saudi Land Forces

 Republic of China Army

 Tunisian Air Force

 Turkish Army

Former operators

 Australian Army

 Canadian Armed Forces

 United States Army

Aircraft on display
 68-16940 – International Airport in Palm Springs, California. Transformed into a sculpture.
 69-16112 – Pima Air and Space Museum in Tucson, Arizona
 69-16123 – Kansas Museum of Military History in Augusta, Kansas
 69-16153 – MAPS Air Museum in North Canton, Ohio
 69-16338 – Point Alpha Museum in Hesse, Germany
 71-20475 – Veterans Memorial Museum, Huntsville, Alabama, United States
71-20869 – National Air Force Museum of Canada, Trenton, Ontario, Canada CH-136 
 71-20920 – Polish Aviation Museum, Kraków, Poland – CH-136
 72-21256 – The Aviation Museum of Kentucky in Lexington, Kentucky

Specifications (OH-58D)

See also

References

Footnotes

Citations

Bibliography
 
 Holley, Charles, and Mike Sloniker. Primer of the Helicopter War. Grapevine, Tex: Nissi Publ, 1997. .
 Spenser, Jay P. "Bell Helicopter". Whirlybirds, A History of the U.S. Helicopter Pioneers. University of Washington Press, 1998. .
 World Aircraft information files Brightstar publishing London File 424 sheet 2

External links

 OH-58 Kiowa Warrior and OH-58D fact sheets on Army.mil
 OH-58D armament systems page on Army.mil
 Kiowa Warrior Mast-Mounted Sight (MMS) Sensor Suite on northropgrumman.com

Bell aircraft
Bell OH-58 Kiowa
H-58 Kiowa
1960s United States helicopters
Bell OH-58 Kiowa
Aircraft first flown in 1966